The Hundred of Bundey was a hundred within County of Disraeli in the Northern Territory of Australia.  The hundred was gazetted on 7 August 1884 and lapsed with the passage in 1976 and subsequent assent of the Crown Lands Ordinance 1976 (No. 1 of 1977) and the Crown Lands (Validation of Proclamations) Ordinance 1976 (No. 2 of 1977).

It is believed to have been named after William Henry Bundey (1838-1909) who was South Australian Attorney-General from 1878 to 1881 and the third judge of the Supreme Court of South Australia.

See also
Hundred of Bundey (South Australia)

References

B